Cula Naga (a.k.a. Khujjanaga) was King of Anuradhapura in the second century and the successor of Kanittha Tissa. He ascended the throne in 193 A.D. He only ruled for two years until he was overthrown and assassinated by his brother, Kudda Naga.

See also
 List of Sri Lankan monarchs
 History of Sri Lanka

References

External links
 Kings & Rulers of Sri Lanka
 Codrington's Short History of Ceylon

Monarchs of Anuradhapura
C
C
C